Silvia Alonso Cruz (born 28 December 1989, in Salamanca) is a Spanish actress. Her debut was as the protagonist of the Telecinco series Tierra de lobos, playing Almudena Lobo. She has participated in different Spanish series such as Amar es para siempre, Sin identidad and Tiempos de guerra.

Biography
She was educated in the schools of interpretation Arte 4 and Metropolis, she has also taken courses of interpretation before the camera and oriental dance.

In 2010 she gained fame thanks to her role as Almudena Lobo in the Telecinco series Tierra de lobos, which premiered its first season on 29 September 2010. Due to its good audiences the series was renewed until the third season, with Alonso being protagonist of all of them.

In 2013 she joined the shooting of the second season of the series Amar es para siempre, broadcast on Antena 3 daily. Alonso played Alejandra Torrijos, a young researcher who is involved in a relationship with Luis Ardanza (Jordi Rebellón), her teacher. They both left the series after the end of the second season.

In 2014 she made her first foray into the cinema participating in the film Shrew's Nest with Macarena Gómez and Nadia de Santiago. Also that year she joined the recurring cast of Telecinco's comedy series La que se avecina, where she played Patricia, the social worker who helped Amador (Pablo Chiapella) and Maite (Eva Isanta).

In April 2015, she joined the second season of the Antena 3 series Sin identidad. There she played Helena López until the series ended. Also that year she participated as a guest character in the Antena 3 series Velvet, playing Michelle.

In February 2016, Antena 3 premiered the series Perdiendo el norte in which Alonso played Adela, a young Spanish woman living in Berlin who meets Carol (Belén Cuesta), another Spanish emigrant who makes her start to doubt her style of life. In addition, that year also premiered La corona partida, a film that links the series Isabel and Carlos, rey emperador, both on Televisión Española. In the film she played Germaine of Foix, who was the second wife of Ferdinand II of Aragon after the death of Isabella the Catholic.

In 2017 she appeared in the films It's for Your Own Good, by Carlos Therón, and Lord, Give Me Patience, by Álvaro Díaz Lorenzo. Also for 2017 was the scheduled premiere of the Antena 3 series Tiempos de guerra.

Filmography

Television

Films
Shrew's Nest, as Doña Puri's niece. Dir. Juanfer Andrés and Esteban Roel (2014)
La corona partida, as Germaine of Foix. Dir. Jordi Frades (2015)
It's for Your Own Good, as Valentina. Dir. Carlos Therón (2017)
Lord, Give Me Patience, as Alicia Zaldívar Ramos. Dir. Álvaro Díaz Lorenzo (2017)
 Love at First Kiss (2023)

Short films
Antidote, with the Complutense University of Madrid (2008)
Hakushi, distribution. Dir. Guy Khandjian (2008)
Divina comedia, distribution. Dir. Sebastián Cardemil (2009)
Siempre tarde, distribution. Dir. Fermín Pérez (2009)
Una de almejas, distribution. Dir. José Pena Millor (2009)
La trampa, distribution. Dir. Javier Oyarzo (2009)
Yo nunca, distribution. Dir. Ana Belén Domínguez Nevado (2009)
Tópicos, distribution. Dir. Javier Oyarzo (2009)
Zona muerta, distribution. Dir. Javier Oyarzo. Half-length film (2009)
Mentiras, as Muriel. Dir. Ana de Nevado (2011)

Theatre
Sexo 10.0. Dir. Chos Corzo
Futuro 10.0. Dir. Chos Corzo
Much Ado About Nothing. Dir. Juan López Tagle

Video clips
Caída libre (2016), by Zahara

Private life
In 2010 she had a brief romance with her co-star Álex García.

References

External links 

  

1989 births
People from Salamanca
Spanish television actresses
Spanish film actresses
Spanish stage actresses
Living people
21st-century Spanish actresses
Actresses from Castile and León